Stefano Margoni (born May 12, 1975 in Pozza di Fassa, Italy) is an Italian professional ice hockey player who participated at the 2010 IIHF World Championship as a member of the Italian National men's ice hockey team. He also competed at the 1998 Winter Olympics and the 2006 Winter Olympics.

References

1975 births
Living people
Ice hockey players at the 1998 Winter Olympics
Ice hockey players at the 2006 Winter Olympics
Italian ice hockey left wingers
Olympic ice hockey players of Italy
Sportspeople from Trentino